Collines may refer to:

Collines Department, Benin
Pays des Collines
Subdivisions of Burundi#Collines